The 2019 Newark and Sherwood District Council election took place on 2 May 2019 to elect all 39 members of Newark and Sherwood District Council in Nottinghamshire, England. This took place as part of the 2019 local elections.

Result
The election resulted in the Conservative Party retaining its control of the council, with an increased majority.

Ward Results

Balderton North and Coddington

Balderton South

Beacon

Bilsthorpe

Boughton

Bridge

Castle

Collingham

Devon

Dover Beck

Edwinstowe and Clipstone

Farndon and Fernwood

Farnsfield

Lowdham

Muskham

Ollerton

Rainworth North and Rufford

Rainworth South and Blidworth

Southwell

Sutton-on-Trent

Trent

By-elections

Rainworth South & Blidworth

Collingham

References

2019 English local elections
2019
2010s in Nottinghamshire
May 2019 events in the United Kingdom